Quintín Paredes y Babila (September 9, 1884 – January 30, 1973), often referred to as Quintin Paredes Sr. to distinguish him from his son with the same name, was a Filipino lawyer, politician, and statesman.

Early life
He was born in Bangued, Abra, Philippines in 1884 to Don Juan Félix Paredes y Pe Benito and Regine Babila.

Education and early career
He obtained his elementary education at the school his father had established, and also studied at the Colegio Seminario de Vigan and at the Colegio de San Juan de Letran. He pursued law at the Escuela de Derecho de Manila. Graduating in 1907, Paredes took and passed the bar examinations the same year, and started his private practice in Manila.

He was appointed fourth prosecuting attorney on July 9, 1908, first prosecuting attorney on November 1, 1913, and served until March 1, 1917.

Government service
He served as Philippine Solicitor General from March 1, 1917 to 1918, as Attorney-General from 1918 to July 1, 1920, and as Secretary of Justice from 1920 to 1921. As Attorney-General, Paredes was a member of the first parliamentary mission to the United States in 1919. He resumed the practice of law in Manila in 1921.

Political career

House of Representatives
He was elected to the Philippine House of Representatives to represent the Abra's at-large congressional district in 1925, 1928, 1931, and 1934, serving as Speaker pro tempore of the House of Representatives from 1929 to 1931, and as the Speaker itself from 1934 till 1935. In 1935 he was elected as a member of the Philippine Assembly but he resigned to serve as the Philippines' Resident Commissioner.

 Under the Tydings–McDuffie Act that created the Philippine Commonwealth Government, Paredes became its first Resident Commissioner, serving from February 14, 1936, until his resignation on September 29, 1938.

In 1938 he was again elected a member of the Philippine Assembly, and served as the Majority Floor Leader during this term.  He was also elected as a member of the Philippine Senate from 1941 to 1945 that did not sit in session due to the onset of World War II and the Japanese Occupation of the Philippines.

After the Second World War, Paredes ran again for his old post representing Abra in the Philippine House of Representatives, and won. He held this post from 1946 to 1949.

Senate
In the Philippine elections of 1949, Paredes topped the Senatorial race as a candidate of the Liberal Party. He briefly became the President of the Philippine Senate in 1952, and was reelected as a Philippine Senator in 1955, finishing his second term in 1961. Retiring from politics in 1963, Paredes died ten years later in Manila.

Other posts held
Dean of the law school (Escuela de Derecho) of Manila, 1913 to 1917
President of the General Bank & Trust Co., 1963 to 1969

See also
List of Asian Americans and Pacific Islands Americans in the United States Congress
Resident Commissioner of the Philippines

Footnotes

References

External links
Biography of Senate President Paredes at the Philippine Senate Website
A work translated by Paredes, 

1884 births
1973 deaths
Burials at the Manila North Cemetery
Colegio de San Juan de Letran alumni
Deputy Speakers of the House of Representatives of the Philippines
Filipino collaborators with Imperial Japan
Ilocano people
Filipino people of Arab descent
Laurel administration cabinet members
Liberal Party (Philippines) politicians
Majority leaders of the House of Representatives of the Philippines
Members of the House of Representatives of the Philippines from Abra (province)
Members of the United States Congress of Filipino descent
Nacionalista Party politicians
People from Abra (province)
Filipino Freemasons
Presidents pro tempore of the Senate of the Philippines
Presidents of the Senate of the Philippines
Quezon administration cabinet members
Resident Commissioners of the Philippines
Secretaries of Justice of the Philippines
Senators of the 1st Congress of the Commonwealth of the Philippines
Senators of the 2nd Congress of the Philippines
Senators of the 3rd Congress of the Philippines
Senators of the 4th Congress of the Philippines
Solicitors General of the Philippines
Speakers of the House of Representatives of the Philippines
Members of the Philippine Legislature
Members of the National Assembly of the Philippines